Jeff Brand is an American politician serving in the Minnesota House of Representatives since 2023 who also served from 2019 to 2020. A member of the Minnesota Democratic–Farmer–Labor Party (DFL), Brand represents District 18A in south-central Minnesota, which includes the cities of St. Peter and North Mankato, Nicollet County, and parts of Blue Earth and Le Sueur Counties.

Early life, education, and career
Brand was raised in Howard Lake, Minnesota. He graduated from the Parks Law Enforcement Academy with a certificate, from Vermilion Community College, and from Minnesota State University, Mankato, with a Bachelor of Science in cultural anthropology with a minor in history.

Brand served as a member of the St. Peter City Council from 2011 to 2018. He co-owns a rain garden installation and native plant landscaping company, Seed to Site, with his wife, Genevieve.

Minnesota House of Representatives
Brand was elected to the Minnesota House of Representatives in 2018, after incumbent Clark Johnson retired. In 2020, he ran for reelection, losing to Republican Susan Akland by 108 votes. In 2022, Brand ran against Akland again, this time winning by 411 votes, and is serving his second non-consecutive term.

In 2019-20, Brand served as vice chair of the Agriculture and Food Finance and Policy Committee. He is the vice chair of the Workforce Development Finance and Policy Committee and sits on the Environment and Natural Resources Finance and Policy, Taxes, and Transportation Finance and Policy Committees.

Electoral history

Personal life
Brand and his wife, Genevieve, have two children. He resides in St. Peter, Minnesota.

References

External links

 Official House of Representatives website
 Official campaign website

Living people
Democratic Party members of the Minnesota House of Representatives
21st-century American politicians
Year of birth missing (living people)